Old Mother Riley's Jungle Treasure is a low budget 1951 British comedy film, the penultimate in the long running Old Mother Riley series  starring Arthur Lucan and Kitty McShane. It features an early appearance by future Carry On regular Peter Butterworth.

Husband and wife Arthur Lucan and Kitty McShane had separated by the time of production, and were touring in different "Old Mother Riley" shows. This was Kitty's final Mother Riley film, and her scenes with Lucan were reputedly shot on separate days.

During filming, there was a strike over pay, led by the dancer Josie Woods, who was an extra on the film.

Plot summary
Mother Riley, working in an antique shop with daughter Kitty, uncovers a secret treasure map hidden in the headboard of an antique bed. With the help of the ghost of the pirate Captain Morgan, mother and daughter head for a remote tropical island in the South Seas, and begin their hunt for buried treasure. Not only do they find the fortune, but Mother Riley ends up celebrated by natives as a tribal queen.

Sample gag
"All the supposed cannibal tribesman are in actual fact ex-Oxford graduates who spend their time (in full tribal dress) listening to the cricket on the short wave radio." ("Screensnapshots.blogspot.co.uk")

Cast
Old Mother Riley ...Arthur Lucan
Kitty ...	Kitty McShane
Jim ...	Garry Marsh
Captain Daincourt ...	Cyril Chamberlain
Chief 'Stinker' Carstairs ...	Robert Adams
James Orders ...	Roddy Hughes
Harry Benson ...	Willer Neal
Estelle ...	Anita D'ray
Morgan the Pirate ...	Sebastian Cabot
Flying Officer Prang ...	Bill Shine (actor)
Steve ...	Peter Butterworth
Mr Benson ...	Peter Swanwick
Slim ...	Harry Lane
Jake ...	Michael Ripper
Air Hostess ...	Maria Mercedes
Ted ...	Gerald Rex

Critical reception
TV Guide called the movie, a "relentlessly absurd farce...A film in the stylized vein of British comedy (as are all the pictures in the "Old Mother Riley" series) that continues through the films of Monty Python."
David Parkinson writes in Moviemail.com, " a discreet veil should be drawn over the last third of Jungle Treasure (1951), as its racial stereotyping outdoes anything seen in a Tarzan adventure."

References

External links
 

1951 films
Films directed by Maclean Rogers
1951 comedy films
British comedy films
Films set in Africa
British black-and-white films
1950s English-language films
1950s British films